Øhavsstien (English: Archipelago Trail) is one of the longest hiking trails in Denmark. The trail goes through the South Funen Archipelago, along southern regions of Funen, as well as the islands of Tåsinge, Langeland and Ærø. It is exclusively a hiking trail, and bikes and horses are not allowed.

Route
The route is divided into seven legs:
 Faldsled - Faaborg - Fjællebroen (39 km) 
 Fjællebroen - Egebjerg Bakker - Svendborg  (30 km)
 Svendborg - Broholm - Lundeborg (30 km)
 Svendborg - Tåsinge - Rudkøbing (20 km)
 Lohals - Tranekær - Stengade Strand (29 km)
 Stengade Strand - Rudkøbing - Henninge Nor (26 km)
 Marstal - Ærøskøbing - Søby (36 km)

References

External links
traildino.com
detsydfynskeoehav.dk
Waymarked Trails

Hiking trails in Denmark